Butte High School is a public high school in Butte, Montana. It was established 125 years ago in 1896.

Academics and Student Life
Due to Butte High School's close association with local university Montana Tech, students are offered a large number of dual credit and AP courses, ranging from United States Government to Chemistry. Butte High School has a number of sports including, but not limited to: American football, volleyball, basketball, and golf. As for non-sport related activities, Butte High School has a  speech and debate program as well as a band. Clubs are also a staple of a student's repertoire with Excel Club and History Club maintaining active student rosters.

Notable alumni

Athletes
Colt Anderson, NFL football player.
Bob O'Billovich, scout for the BC Lions.
Milt Popovich, NFL football player; Chicago Cardinals halfback.
Pat Ogrin, former NFL football player; Washington Redskins.
Sonny Holland, former college football coach.

Entertainment and Arts
Evel Knievel, daredevil.
Paul B. Lowney, cartoonist.
Mary MacLane, writer.
Tim Montana, singer.

Law and Politics
Mike Cooney, current Lieutenant Governor of Montana.
George Horse-Capture, Native American activist, curator, National Museum of the American Indian
 Judy Martz, 22nd Governor of Montana
Stephanie Schriock, president of EMILY's List
John Walsh, Lieutenant Governor of Montana (2013–2014); United States Senator from Montana (2014–2015).

References

External links
Butte School District #1
Butte High

Public high schools in Montana
Buildings and structures in Butte, Montana
Schools in Silver Bow County, Montana